Albert Isaac "Buzz" Bezzerides ( August 9, 1908 – January 1, 2007) was an American novelist and screenwriter, best known for writing films noir and action motion pictures, especially several of Warners' "social conscience" films of the 1940s.

Personal life
Bezzerides was born in Samsun, Ottoman Turkey, to a Greek father and an Armenian mother, who emigrated to America before he was two years old.

Career
Bezzerides began writing short stories as a student at the University of California, Berkeley, where he studied electrical engineering. He was first published in a 1935 issue of Story Magazine, which printed his story, "Passage Into Eternity." He wrote the 1938 novel The Long Haul, about the trucking business. In 1940, Warner Bros. offered him $2,000 for movie rights to the story. He learned later that the script based on the book had already been written by others. The resulting film, They Drive By Night, starring Humphrey Bogart and George Raft, was a critical and commercial hit.

The studio also offered Bezzerides a contract to be a screenwriter at a salary of $300 a week. At the time, he was working as a communications engineer for the Los Angeles Department of Water and Power. He later commented, "I had no idea whether it was guilt or conscience, or greed to swindle more stories out of me, that motivated Warner Bros. to offer me a seven-year contract ... Whatever their reason, I grabbed their offer so I could quit my putrid career as a communications engineer by becoming a writer, writing scripts in an entirely new world.. His first screenplay was for 1942's Juke Girl, which starred Ann Sheridan and Ronald Reagan.

Films based on his novels or screenplays included Desert Fury (1947), Thieves' Highway (1949), On Dangerous Ground (1952), Beneath the 12 Mile Reef (1953) and Track of the Cat (1954). He wrote the screenplay for the 1962 espionage thriller The Angry Hills, which was set in Nazi-occupied Greece during World War II and based on a novel by Leon Uris. He wrote prolifically for television in the 1950s and '60s and was a co-creator of the Western television series The Big Valley.

Bezzerides' script for Kiss Me Deadly (1955) transformed the novel by Mickey Spillane into an apocalyptic, atomic-age paranoia film noir. When asked about his script, and his decision to make "the great whatsit" the Pandora's Box objective of a ruthless cast of characters, Bezzerides commented: "People ask me about the hidden meanings in the script, about the A-bomb, about McCarthyism, what does the poetry mean, and so on. And I can only say that I didn't think about it when I wrote it . . . I was having fun with it. I wanted to make every scene, every character, interesting. A girl comes up to Ralph Meeker, I make her a nympho. She grabs him and kisses him the first time she sees him. She says, "You don't taste like anybody I know." I'm a big car nut, so I put in all that stuff with the cars and the mechanic. I was an engineer, and I gave the detective the first phone answering machine in that picture. I was having fun."

Novels
 1938 : The Long Haul
 1942 : There Is a Happy Land
 1949 : Thieves' Market

References

External links
 
 , a documentary on Bezzerides' life
 Obituary, The Fresno Bee
 McLellan, Dennis. (2007, Jan. 9). A.I. Bezzerides, 91; novelist became a screenwriter known for film noir classics. The Los Angeles Times

1908 births
2007 deaths

Emigrants from the Ottoman Empire to the United States
American people of Greek descent
American people of Armenian descent
UC Berkeley College of Engineering alumni
20th-century American male writers